Dan Barna (born 10 July 1975) is a Romanian politician and lawyer. He served as the president of the Save Romania Union (USR), and as co-president of USR-PLUS until 1 October 2021. He was elected a member of the Chamber of Deputies in 2016.

Biography
Barna was born in Sibiu, Sibiu County, Socialist Republic of Romania on 10 July 1975. He graduated from the law school at the University of Bucharest in 1998 and obtained a master's degree in project management from Politehnica University of Bucharest in 2003. After working as a lawyer, he completed a course financed by the European Commission, and became a consultant for EU funds. A consultancy company he founded with a colleague led him to implement a number of projects financed from the European Social Fund. According to a media investigation, he was allegedly involved in a financial scheme during his entrepreneurship time, allegations which he rejected.

In May 2016, he began working for the then Prime Minister of Romania Dacian Cioloș as Secretary of State with the Ministry of European Funds. He then joined the Save Romania Union (USR), a centre-right political party, where he was elected a deputy in Romania's parliament in December 2016, and president of the party in October 2017.

2019 presidential election

Barna announced his intention to run in the 2019 Romanian presidential election on 1 July 2019. His candidacy attracted controversy due to him not complying with the legal requirements regarding the mention of a candidate's first-degree relatives income, in the public declaration of assets (document required in a candidate's file, while registering at the electoral board). He stated that his wife's income - who was at the time employed at Petrom - was "classified". Soon after the story sparked, he declassified his wife's annual income and changed his assets statement.

Barna campaigned on a platform of constitutional reform, saying "Romania needs a full-time president, that is, a non-stop president, who does not go away." His running-mate was Dacian Cioloș, who would have become Prime Minister if they had won the parliamentary elections the following year. His election strategy was to convince the electorate to vote for him to hinder the PSD candidate, Viorica Dăncilă, from entering the second round of voting. Barna did not receive enough votes to enter the second round and subsequently endorsed Klaus Iohannis, who was re-elected for a second and last term.

Positions
Barna has said "Gay marriage is not yet a subject for the public agenda, there is no initiative promoting same-sex marriage. Maybe in 20, 30 years next generations will take care of this problem, but for now, this is not a priority."

Electoral history

Presidential elections

Notes

References

External links 
 Parliamentary activity
 Noul președinte USR, Dan Barna: Vreau să ieșim din logica de ONG cu parlamentari și să intrăm în logica unui partid cu obiective politice clare, by Dan Tapalagă, Hotnews.ro -  31 October 2017 (in Romanian)
 Negociază USR cu Dacian Cioloș?, Adevărul.ro -  21 November 2017 (in Romanian)
 Dan Barna: Save Romania Union similar to Macron’s En Marche, Euractiv.com -  21 February 2018 (in English)
 Dan Barna: USR, o alternativă la sistemul clasic de vândut povești o dată la patru ani, by Andreea Pora, Revista 22 -  27 March 2018 (in Romanian)
 Dan Barna: "Vreau să fiu un președinte implicat. Nu există o variantă de PSD mai cumsecade", by Ioana Ene Dogioiu, Ziare.com -  27 July 2019 (in Romanian)

1975 births
Living people
People from Sibiu
Members of the Chamber of Deputies (Romania)
Save Romania Union politicians
University of Bucharest alumni
Politehnica University of Bucharest alumni